Double Chooz was a short-baseline neutrino oscillation experiment in Chooz, France. Its goal was to measure or set a limit on the θ13 mixing angle, a neutrino oscillation parameter responsible for changing electron neutrinos into other neutrinos.  The experiment uses reactors of the Chooz Nuclear Power Plant as a neutrino source and measures the flux of neutrinos they receive. To accomplish this, Double Chooz has a set of two detectors situated 400 meters and 1050 meters from the reactors. Double Chooz was a successor to the Chooz experiment; one of its detectors occupies the same site as its predecessor. Until January 2015 all data has been collected using only the far detector. The near detector was completed in September 2014, after construction delays, and started taking data at the beginning of 2015. Both detectors stopped taking data in late December 2017.

Detector design 
Double Chooz used two identical gadolinium-doped liquid scintillator detectors placed in vicinity of two 4.25 GW thermal power reactors to measure antineutrino disappearance.  The two detectors are aptly referred to as "near", 400 meters from the reactor; and "far", 1,050 meters from the reactor. The far detector is placed inside a hill such that there is a 300 meters of water equivalent of shielding from cosmic muons. The detector itself is a calorimetric liquid scintillator consisting of four concentric cylindrical vessels.

Neutrino target and γ-catcher 
The innermost vessel is made of acrylic plastic and has a diameter of 230 cm, a height of 245.8 cm, and a thickness of 0.8 cm. This chamber is filled with 10,000 liters of gadolinium (Gd) loaded (1 gram/liter) liquid scintillator; it is the neutrino target. The next layer out is the γ-catcher. It surrounds the neutrino target with a 55 cm thick layer of Gd-free liquid scintillator. The casing for the γ-catcher is 12 cm thick and made of the same material as the neutrino catcher. The materials are chosen so that both of these vessels are transparent to photons with a wavelength greater than 400 nm.

Buffer vessel and PMTs 
The buffer vessel is made of stainless steel 304L with dimensions of 552.2 cm wide by 568.0 cm tall and 0.3 cm thick. The remainder of the interior space that isn't occupied by the acrylic double vessel is filled with a non-scintillating mineral oil. On the inner surface of the buffer vessel are 390 10-inch photomultiplier tubes. The purpose of the buffer layer is to shield from radioactivity in the PMTs and the surrounding rock. These to layers in addition to the neutrino target and γ-catcher are collectively referred to as the "inner detector."

Inner and outer vetos
The inner veto surrounds the buffer vessel with a 50 cm thick layer of scintillating mineral oil. In addition, it has 78 8-inch PMTs distributed on the top, bottom and sides. This inner veto layer serves as an active veto layer for muons and fast neutrons. The surrounding 15 cm thick steel casing further serves to shield against external γ-rays. The outer veto covers the top of the detector tank. It consists of strips with a 5 cm x 1 cm cross section laid in orthogonal directions.

Data collection
Signals from the inner detector and the inner veto are recorded by 8-bit flash ADC electronics with a sampling rate of 500 MHz. The trigger threshold for the detectors is set to 350 keV, much lower than the 1.02 MeV expected of the electron anti-neutrinos.

For several years Double Chooz has operated with only the far detector and has used models such as Bugey4 to calculate the expected flux.  The completed near detector will allow increased precision in the next years of data taking.

Experimental techniques

Neutrino mixing
Neutrinos are electrically neutral, extremely light particles that only interact weakly, meaning they can travel vast distances without ever being noticed. One of the properties of neutrinos is that as the propagate they have a chance to oscillate from one flavor to another, and this is the principle under which the experiment operates. The goal of Double Chooz is to more tightly constrain the value for the   mixing angle.

The Chooz experiment, performed in the 1990s, found that the  mixing angle is constrained by

which was the best experimental upper limit for over a decade. The goal of the Double Chooz experiment is to continue to explore the  angle by probing an even smaller region

Observations of the mixing angle are accomplished by observing the  flux that comes off of the reactors during their fission reactions. The expected  flux from the reactors is about 50 per day.  Because one of the neutrino mass-squared differences is much smaller than the other, the Double Chooz experiment only needs to consider a two-flavor oscillation. In the two-flavor model the survival probability of any given neutrino is modelled by

From this the value of the mixing angle can be measured from the oscillation amplitude in reactor neutrino oscillations.

Observations
The neutrinos from the reactor are observed via the inverse beta decay (IBD) process

Since there are backgrounds to consider, candidates for (IBD) are determined by the following: visible energy from the prompt signal must be between 0.5 and 20 MeV; the delayed signal must have an energy between 4 and 10 MeV; the time difference between those two signals must be between 0.5 and 150 microseconds; the distance between the vertices of the two signals should be less than 100 cm; and no other signals (except for the delayed signal) are found 200 microseconds before or 600 microseconds after the prompt signal. Detection of the prompt signal has reached nearly 100% efficiency, however it is not as easy to detect the delayed signal due to issues such as Gd-concentration and neutron scattering models.

Results

Mixing angle
In November 2011, first results of the experiment, using 228 days of data, were presented at the LowNu conference in Seoul, hinting at a non-zero value of θ13, followed by an article submitted to arXiv in December 2011.
In the PRL article (published in 2012), the zero θ13 oscillation hypothesis was excluded at 2.9 sigma by combining the Double Chooz experiment disappearance data and the T2K experiment appearance data, that had been released only some months before. This result became both the most important evidence at the time and the first accurate measurement of the amplitude of θ13. Only some months later, the Daya Bay experiment provided its confirming measurement and the ultimate discovery (i.e ≥5σ significance) evidence. The central values of both Double Chooz and Daya Bay experiments were in excellent agreement and has remained so (within ≤2σ) so far. A similar analysis combination technique as done by the Double Chooz experiment in 2012 has been employed by the T2K experiment to yield the first constraints on the non-zero CP-violation phase in 2020.

Neutron capture on hydrogen was used to produce independent data, which was analysed to yield a separate measurement in 2013:

Using reactor-off data, a background-independent measurement was published July 2014 in Physics Letters B:

An improved measurement with reduced background and systematic uncertainties after 467.90 days of data was published in the Journal of High Energy Physics in 2014:

Other results
Double Chooz was able to identify positronium formation in their detector, which delays positron annihilation and distorts the scintillation signal. A tagging algorithm was developed that could be used in neutrino detectors for improved background rejection, which was similarly done by Borexino for cosmogenic 11C background.

Limits on Lorentz violation parameters were also set.

Bibliography

References

External links
 Project Homepage

Neutrino experiments
Reactor neutrino experiments